Neeshad V. Shafi is a Qatar based climate advocate and environmental activist. He is the Co-Founder of the Arab Youth Climate Movement Qatar, a movement working on creating climate change awareness and policies in Qatar. Neeshad’s work includes mainstreaming climate change issues, youth advocacy and grassroots work in Qatar. He is currently the Executive Director at the Arab Youth Climate Movement Qatar and also a Non-Resident Fellow at Middle East Institute (MEI).

Career
Neeshad, pursued his masters in Energy and Environmental Engineering from VIT University. His Master thesis was based on “Modeling Regional Impact of Meteorological Parameters over Different Sectors in Climate Change Scenario in India". After attending the United Nations Climate Change Summit COP-21 in Paris he focused on working to ensure active participation of the Arab youth from the Global South, in the Global Climate movement. He was voted as the "Worlds 100 most influential people in climate policy" in 2019 by Apolitical. Few of the international summits and youth summits that he is actively participating in are - United Nations Framework Convention on Climate Change (UNFCCC), Conference of Parties COP 21, COP22, COP23, COP24, COP26 World Economic Forum (WEF) Davos 2019, Negotiations at Conferences of Parties, World Economic Forum Middle East (2019), Global Landscapes Forum Bonn (2019), UN Youth Climate Summit 2019 and UN Youth Climate Summit (2020).

Neeshad is a TEDx Speaker and Agenda Contributor for the World Economic Forum. In 2019 he was named in the "The World's 100 Most Influential People In Climate Policy".

Climate Activism

Neeshad grew up in Qatar where his family lives now. He became involved in climate activism during his Masters's Degree programme at VIT University where he got the first understanding of Climate change issues and the science behind environmental changes as a part of his research work. Following his graduation, Neeshad’ took up the work to mainstreaming climate change issues across various sectors and at multiple scales from local in Qatar to Regional in Middle East Countries. He co-founded the Arab Youth Climate Movement Qatar, a youth-led grassroots, non-profit and independent association in the State of Qatar. His work has supported various NGOs, private sectors, governments and multinational agencies in taking evidence-based decisions and delivering impact on the ground.

Arab Youth Climate  Movement Qatar
Arab Youth Climate Movement is a youth-led non-profit and independent organization which was co-founded by Neeshad in 2015 to become an independent and informed voice in Qatar and the Arab region by creating innovative grassroots environmental advocacy and education high-quality campaigns, awareness building, research papers, briefings, etc. to support in developing sound environmental policies in the state of Qatar. Founded at its grassroots in the State of Qatar in 2015, The Arab Youth Climate Movement Qatar (AYCMQA) has been focused on environmental awareness, climate policy and in bringing more people into the environmental movement to address the ever-increasing threat of the ecological crisis we face today. Ever since its inception, Arab Youth Climate Movement Qatar has grown beyond the borders of Qatar to become one of the most effective and wide-reaching environmental organizations in Qatar with global recognition.

Journalism
Neeshad frequently writes for World Economic Forum on issues of youth movement and their role in climate action in the MENA region and other various environmental policies and opinions. He also writes for Qatar Tribune and Doha News on national climate policy for climate action in Qatar.

Neeshad also penned an important piece in the acclaimed Cario Review for Global Affairs on the role of Young people in leading climate action in the MENA region, recently he also writes for the Middle East Institute on various climate and energy transition issues in MENA and Europe.

Selected publications
How the Ukraine war exposed Europe’s derailed energy transition and its hypocrisy toward the Middle East, Middle East Institute 
Young People Are Leading Climate Activism in the Middle East, The Cairo Review of Global Affairs
OPINION: Why climate change should be a top priority for Qatar and GCC region
As UN climate summit returns to the Middle East, Arab youth fear a lack of representation and opportunities, Middle East Institute
The UN, climate, and security, Middle East Institute
Leading the Youth Climate Movement in the Arab World
A new era of climate action diplomacy in the Middle East, World Economic Forum
Ending plastic pollution will take more than a beach cleanup, World Economic Forum
Can fighting climate change bring the Arab world closer together?, World Economic Forum
The Arab world's best weapon against climate change? Its young people, World Economic Forum
Arab Youth Climate Movement Qatar, IJW

References 

Climate activists
Qatari activists
Year of birth missing (living people)
Living people